Frank Joseph Quayle III (born January 15, 1947) is a former American and Canadian football player who played for the Denver Broncos and Hamilton Tiger-Cats. He played college football at the University of Virginia.

References

1947 births
Living people
Sportspeople from Brooklyn
Players of American football from New York City
American football running backs
Canadian football running backs
Virginia Cavaliers football players
Denver Broncos (AFL) players
Hamilton Tiger-Cats players
Players of Canadian football from New York (state)
Garden City High School (New York) alumni